The Best Off Nynja is a French ultralight aircraft, designed by Best Off in conjunction with their British importer, Flylight, and produced by Best Off in France. The aircraft is supplied as a kit for amateur construction.

Design and development
The aircraft is a development of the earlier Best Off Skyranger and was designed to comply with the Fédération Aéronautique Internationale microlight rules. It features a strut-braced high-wing a two-seats-in-side-by-side configuration enclosed cockpit, fixed tricycle landing gear and a single engine in tractor configuration.

The aircraft is made from aluminum tubing, with its flying surfaces covered in Dacron sailcloth but the fuselage covered in composite panels. Its  span wing employs V-struts and jury struts. The standard engine available is the  Rotax 912UL four-stroke powerplant.

Specifications (Nynja)

References

External links

2000s French ultralight aircraft
Homebuilt aircraft
Single-engined tractor aircraft
High-wing aircraft
Nynja